The 2012 FC Gifu season sees FC Gifu compete in J.League Division 2 for the fifth consecutive season. FC Gifu are also competing in the 2012 Emperor's Cup.

Players

Competitions

J. League

League table

Matches

Emperor's Cup

References

FC Gifu
2012